Nagar (Riyasat Nagar) was a princely salute state in the northern part of Gilgit–Baltistan, Pakistan. Until August 1947, it was in a subsidiary alliance with British India. It bordered the states of the Gilgit Agency to the south and west, and the princely state of District Hunza to the north and east. From November 1947 to 1974 it was a princely state of Pakistan. The state capital was the town of Nagar.

The territory previously covered by Nagar forms three tehsils of the Nagar District of Northern Pakistan.

History 
Nagar, founded in the fourteenth century, was an autonomous principality until the British gained control of the state following the Hunza–Nagar Campaign (1889-1893). It was a colonial princely state under the administration of the Gilgit Agency until 1947, but from 1868 it was a vassal of the Maharaja of Jammu and Kashmir, despite never being directly ruled by Kashmir. The rulers of Nagar were considered to be among the most loyal vassals of the Maharajas of Jammu and Kashmir, sending annual tributes to their Durbars until 1947. The British granted them a Hereditary gun salute of 15-guns.

In November 1947, the ruler, Mir Shaukat Ali Khan acceded Nagar to Pakistan, which became responsible for its external affairs and defense, while Nagar maintained internal self-government. In 1968, Syed Yahya Shah, the first educated politician of the valley, demanded civil rights from the Mir of Nagar. In 1973, when Ayub Khan's dictatorship ended in Pakistan and the Pakistan People's Party (under Zulfiqar Ali Bhutto) was elected, the government forced the Mir of Nagar to abdicate. The area was then merged with the Northern Areas.

Government 
The state was governed by the hereditary rulers of the Maglot dynasty, who were styled as Mir. The details of these early rulers are uncertain; the first definite dates available are from 1839. In November 1947, the state became one of the princely states of Pakistan. Brigadier Mir Shaukat Ali Khan was the last ruler of the State before it was abolished by Pakistani PM Zulfiqar Ali Bhutto in 1972.

Population

Demographics 
There are around 90,000 inhabitants of the Nagar valley (AKRSP Census, 2000).
 
Nagar is home to two main ethnic groups – the Burushaski speakers and the Shina speakers. An older type of Burushaski is still spoken in the valley with a mild modern accent. A third language, Bedeski, is also still spoken in chalt

Religion 
The population is traditionally predominantly Shia Isna'asheri (Jafaria).

Geography 
The terrain of Nagar is extremely mountainous, which provided a certain degree of protection against invading forces. The highest mountain is the 7,788 m (25,551 ft) Mount Rakaposhi, south of the town of Nagar. The Karakoram Highway crosses Nagar, connecting Pakistan with China via the Khunjerab Pass. The road follows the Hunza river for some distance through Nagar and into the Hunza region. According to local languages Nagar Valley divided into two parts. Nagar Shinaki and Nagar Burosho.

Villages of Nagar 
Shina Speaking Villages in Nagar (Shinaki/Sheenbar)
 Chalat (Paaeen/baala)
 Bar Valley
 Chaprote Valley
 Budalas valley
 Jafarabad Valley
 Nilt Valley
 Thol Valley
 Qasimabad Valley (Masoot)
 Ghulmet Valley
 Yal Valley
 Pissan Valley
 Minapin Valley
Burushaski Speaking Villages in Nagar
 Nagarkhas 
 Sumayar Valley
 Sikandar Abad
 Miachar Valley
 Dadimal Valley
 Phakker Valley
 Hakuchar Valley
 Shayar Valley
 Askurdas Valley
 Hoper Valley
 Hisper Valley
Bilingual Valleys in Nagar
 Chalt Paeen Valley
 Akbarabad Valley
 Jafarabad Valley
 Qasimabad Valley (Mascoot)
 Ghulmet Valley
 Pissan Valley
 Minapin Valley
The Nagar villages are mainly populated by religious scholars, Educationists, Sportsmen, Craftsmen and Craftswomen, farmers, hunters and fishermen, handicrafts, miners, Shepherds, adventurers, mountaineers and so on.

References

Further reading 
 Mohammad Ismail Nashad, Buroshall say Nagar Tek Ka Safar
 Syed Mohammad Yahya Shah, Rasala Buroshall
 E. F. Knight, Zafar Hayat Paul, Where the Three Empires Meet

Sources and external links 
 Government of Pakistan

Princely states of Pakistan
Muslim princely states of India
History of Gilgit-Baltistan
Regions of Gilgit-Baltistan
States and territories established in the 14th century
1974 disestablishments